The 2012 Illinois State Redbirds football team represented Illinois State University as a member of the Missouri Valley Football Conference (MVFC) during the 2012 NCAA Division I FCS football season. Led by fourth-year head coach Brock Spack, the Redbirds compiled an overall record of 9–4 with a mark of 5–3 in conference play, placing in a three-way tie for third in the MVFC. Illinois State received an at-large bid to the NCAA Division I Football Championship playoffs. After a first-round bye, the Redbirds defeated Appalachian State in the second round before falling to Eastern Washington in the quarterfinals. The team played home games at Hancock Stadium in Normal, Illinois.

Illinois State averaged 6,511 fans per home game in 2012 while the East Side of Hancock Stadium was being renovated. Two games were sold out, against Eastern Illinois and Southern Illinois.

Schedule

Ranking movements

Players drafted in the NFL

References

Illinois State
Illinois State Redbirds football seasons
Illinois State
Illinois State Redbirds football